Eurysaurus (meaning "wide lizard") is an extinct genus of plesiosaur, originally classed as a nothosaur, from the Early Jurassic of Echenoz-la-Meline, France, named in 1878. The type material, consisting of a cranium, teeth and five vertebrae, is now lost. The type species is E. raincourti, and a second species, E. schafferi, was named in 1924 but it has since been absorbed into the unrelated genus Germanosaurus.

History
The holotype, first described in 1878 by Albert Gaudry, has since been lost. A new study based essentially on illustrations of the type material by Noè (2001) has considered Eurysaurus a nomen dubium, probably congeneric with the pliosaur Simolestes. However, due to the stratigraphic difference of the two forms, it is possible that Eurysaurus was a separate genus in its own right.

Classification
Gaudry in 1878 originally classified Eurysaurus as a nothosaur. In 2001, Noè reclassified Eurysaurus as a plesiosaur, possibly belonging to the Pliosauroidea.

See also
 Timeline of plesiosaur research

 List of plesiosaurs

References

Early Jurassic plesiosaurs of Europe
Fossils of France
Fossil taxa described in 1878
Sinemurian genus first appearances
Pliensbachian genus extinctions